Wifred II may refer to:

 Wifred II, Count of Barcelona, count of Barcelona, Girona, and Ausona from 897 to 911
 Wifred II, Count of Cerdanya (c. 970 – 1050), Count of Cerdanya (988–1035; as Wifred II) and Count of Berga (1003–1035; as Wifred I)